Utricularia warmingii is a small, annual suspended aquatic carnivorous plant that belongs to the genus Utricularia. U. warmingii is endemic to South America and can be found in Bolivia, Brazil, and Venezuela.

See also 
 List of Utricularia species

References

External links 
 First known photographs of Utricularia warmingii

Carnivorous plants of South America
Flora of Bolivia
Flora of Brazil
Flora of Venezuela
warmingii